De Wild  may refer to:
 De Wild Family, a Dutch family of art professionals
 Ruud de Wild (born 1969), a Dutch radio host
 De Wild., taxonomic author abbreviation for Émile Auguste Joseph De Wildeman (1866–1947), Belgian botanist

See also
 De Wilde, Dutch surname
 De Wildt, town and wildlife centre in South Africa named after Mauritz Edgar de Wildt

Dutch-language surnames